Magnet is an unincorporated community in Coles County, Illinois, United States. Magnet is located along a railroad line south-southwest of Mattoon.

References

Unincorporated communities in Coles County, Illinois
Unincorporated communities in Illinois